LGD Gaming is a Chinese professional esports organization based in Hangzhou. It is one of the oldest esports organizations in China and currently has players competing in Dota 2, Honor of Kings, League of Legends, Overwatch, and PlayerUnknown's Battlegrounds.

LGD's Dota 2 team, PSG.LGD, is in a partnership with PSG Esports, and is known for making it to the grand finals of The International 2018. Its League of Legends team competes in the League of Legends Pro League (LPL), the top level of professional League of Legends in China.

Dota 2 

LGD Gaming's original Dota 2 division was founded along with the organization in 2009. In April 2018, French football club Paris Saint-Germain F.C. partnered with LGD, sponsoring and rebranding the Dota 2 team to PSG.LGD. After winning two Dota Pro Circuit majors in 2017 and 2018, the team secured a directive invite to The International 2018, where they advanced to the grand finals but lost to OG 2–3.

League of Legends

History 
LGD Gaming created their League of Legends division on 20 February 2012, with Zhou "Bug" Qilin leading the team. After the TGA Grand Prix 2012, LGD qualified for the Season 2 China Regional Finals, but fell short after losing to Invictus Gaming. In 2013 Tencent created China's first championship series, the League of Legends Pro League (LPL). LGD failed to join the league through the qualifiers in both the spring and summer seasons of 2013, but was successful the next year, qualifying for the 2014 LPL Spring Split. The team placed fifth in the regular season of the 2014 LPL Spring Split, failing to qualify for playoffs. In the regular season of the 2014 LPL Summer Split however, LGD placed fourth and qualified for playoffs, where they lost to EDward Gaming 0–3 in the first round and Star Horn Royal Club 1–3 in the loser's bracket, remaining in 4th. LGD was unable to qualify for the 2014 World Championship after losing the final qualifying round in the 2014 China Regional Finals to OMG.

After failing to qualify for the 2014 World Championship, LGD decided to sign Korean players in hopes of qualifying the next year. Bot laner Gu "imp" Seung-bin and top laners Choi "Acorn" Cheon-ju and Lee "Flame" Ho-jong were acquired from Samsung White, Samsung Blue, and CJ Entus Blaze respectively. LGD placed sixth in the regular season of the 2015 LPL Spring Split with a 7–5–10 record, qualifying for playoffs. In playoffs the team surprised expectations by beating both OMG and Snake Esports, who were 3rd and 2nd respectively in the regular season, in two 3–0 sweeps. This qualified LGD for the finals, where they lost 2–3 to EDward Gaming in a close series.

Roster

References

External links 
 

2009 establishments in China
Esports teams based in China
Dota teams
League of Legends Pro League teams
Defunct and inactive Overwatch teams
PlayerUnknown's Battlegrounds teams